Kesting is a surname. Notable people with the surname include: 

 Edmund Kesting (1892–1970), German photographer, painter and art professor
 Hans Kesting (born 1960), Dutch actor
 Jürgen Kesting (born 1940), German journalist
 Peter Kesting (born 1955), Australian former cyclist
 Sheilagh Kesting (born 1953), Scottish presbyterian of Church of Scotland

Surnames